Aust-Telemark District Court is a district court located in Notodden, Norway.  It covers the municipalities of Notodden, Hjartdal, Tinn, Bø and Sauherad and is subordinate Agder Court of Appeal.

References

External links 
Official site 

Defunct district courts of Norway
Organisations based in Notodden